Mike Glover (December 18, 1890 – July 11, 1917) was an American boxer who briefly held the World Welterweight Championship in June 1915.  His claim to the title was subsequently recognized by the World Boxing Association.

Early boxing career
By the spring of 1908, Glover had begun his boxing career defeating Harry Phillips, Harry Lortz, Red Shaw, Jim Gardner, Joe Sells, and Tony Bender.  On May 25, 1908, he lost to the great Leach Cross in a fourth round disqualification.  He lost to Frankie Madden in a fourth-round knockout in New York, on December 18, one of his last fights that year. He lost few fights in 1909, finally succumbing to Harlem Tommy Murphey by newspaper decision at the Sharkey Athletic Club in New York, though lasting ten rounds with the seasoned boxer on May 5, 1909.  For the remainder of 1909 and 1910, he beat accomplished boxers Young Nitchie, Willie Moody, Jeff Doherty, and Marty Rowan twice.  On January 28, 1911, he fought the great future World Junior Heavyweight Champion Battling Levinsky in a close six-round bout in Philadelphia.

On May 22, 1911, Glover lost to Buck Crouse at Duquesne Garden in Pittsburgh in a six-round newspaper decision by the Pittsburgh Post.  The Gazette Times agreed with the ruling, emphasizing that shrewd boxing technique was Glover's strength.  It wrote, "Glover is one of the cleverest boys that has come to this city since the boxing game started..."

Claiming the Welterweight Championship of the world

On June 1, 1915, Glover defeated Matt Wells in a points decision at the Atlas Athletic Club in Boston in twelve rounds with Patsy Haley as referee. He held the title only three weeks, losing it to the famed Jack Britton at the same location in a twelve-round points decision.

As was often the case during these years, Glover had attempted to claim the World Title on more than one occasion, first in Boston when he defeated Marcel Thomas, holder of the European World Welterweight title in a TKO on July 22, 1913.  He also claimed to have first defended the title four months later against Jack Britton on November 27, 1913, winning in a ten-round newspaper decision in Brooklyn.

Glover fought Ted "Kid" Lewis at least three times, winning only once, however in a twelve-round points decision in front of a thrilled hometown Boston crowd at the Atlas Athletic Association.  The Evening World wrote, "Mike Glover, the South Boston welterweight gave the local fans one of the biggest surprises of the season last night by getting the decision over Ted Lewis."

End of career, premature death
While Glover was training for a second bout with Ted "Kid" Lewis, he took ill with a serious cold.  Though continuing to get worse, he went through with strenuous training for the fight, and fought the fight as well.  He had to be confined to bed after his loss to Lewis, and finally was rushed to a hospital near death.  Glover died in Middleboro on July 11, 1917, while still at the height of his career, only living to age twenty-six.  He was survived by his wife and one-year-old daughter. The Reading Eagle noted that "he was at one time considered by many sporting writers as the welterweight champion of the country."

Professional boxing record
All information in this section is derived from BoxRec, unless otherwise stated.

Official Record

All newspaper decisions are officially regarded as “no decision” bouts and are not counted in the win/loss/draw column.

Unofficial Record

Record with the inclusion of newspaper decisions in the win/loss/draw column.

See also

Achievements

|-

|-

References

External links
 

Boxers from Boston
American male boxers
World boxing champions
World welterweight boxing champions
Welterweight boxers
1890 births
1917 deaths